Ak-Suu is a village in Leylek District of Batken Region of Kyrgyzstan. It is situated along the river Ak-Suu. Its population was 3,672 in 2021.

References 

Populated places in Batken Region